Nikolayevka is the name of several inhabited localities in Russia.

Altai Krai
As of 2010, nine rural localities in Altai Krai bear this name:
Nikolayevka, Blagoveshchensky District, Altai Krai, a selo in Nikolayevsky Selsoviet of Blagoveshchensky District
Nikolayevka, Loktevsky District, Altai Krai, a selo in Nikolayevsky Selsoviet of Loktevsky District
Nikolayevka (selo), Nikolayevsky Selsoviet, Mikhaylovsky District, Altai Krai, a selo in Nikolayevsky Selsoviet of Mikhaylovsky District
Nikolayevka (station), Nikolayevsky Selsoviet, Mikhaylovsky District, Altai Krai, a station in Nikolayevsky Selsoviet of Mikhaylovsky District
Nikolayevka, Nemetsky National District, Altai Krai, a selo in Nikolayevsky Selsoviet of Nemetsky National District
Nikolayevka, Petropavlovsky District, Altai Krai, a selo in Nikolayevsky Selsoviet of Petropavlovsky District
Nikolayevka, Pospelikhinsky District, Altai Krai, a selo in Nikolayevsky Selsoviet of Pospelikhinsky District
Nikolayevka, Suyetsky District, Altai Krai, a settlement in Boronsky Selsoviet of Suyetsky District
Nikolayevka, Tabunsky District, Altai Krai, a selo in Belozersky Selsoviet of Tabunsky District

Amur Oblast
As of 2010, four rural localities in Amur Oblast bear this name:
Nikolayevka, Bureysky District, Amur Oblast, a selo under the administrative jurisdiction of Novobureysky Urban Settlement of Bureysky District
Nikolayevka, Ivanovsky District, Amur Oblast, a selo in Nikolayevsky Rural Settlement of Ivanovsky District
Nikolayevka, Tambovsky District, Amur Oblast, a selo in Nikolayevsky Rural Settlement of Tambovsky District
Nikolayevka, Zeysky District, Amur Oblast, a selo in Nikolayevsky Rural Settlement of Zeysky District

Arkhangelsk Oblast
As of 2010, one rural locality in Arkhangelsk Oblast bears this name:
Nikolayevka, Arkhangelsk Oblast, a village in Podyuzhsky Selsoviet of Konoshsky District

Astrakhan Oblast
As of 2010, two rural localities in Astrakhan Oblast bear this name:
Nikolayevka, Narimanovsky District, Astrakhan Oblast, a selo in Nikolayevsky Selsoviet of Narimanovsky District
Nikolayevka, Yenotayevsky District, Astrakhan Oblast, a selo in Ivanovo-Nikolayevsky Selsoviet of Yenotayevsky District

Republic of Bashkortostan
As of 2010, seventeen rural localities in the Republic of Bashkortostan bear this name:
Nikolayevka, Alsheyevsky District, Republic of Bashkortostan, a village in Abdrashitovsky Selsoviet of Alsheyevsky District
Nikolayevka, Arkhangelsky District, Republic of Bashkortostan, a village in Orlovsky Selsoviet of Arkhangelsky District
Nikolayevka, Aurgazinsky District, Republic of Bashkortostan, a village in Batyrovsky Selsoviet of Aurgazinsky District
Nikolayevka, Bakalinsky District, Republic of Bashkortostan, a selo in Diyashevsky Selsoviet of Bakalinsky District
Nikolayevka, Beloretsky District, Republic of Bashkortostan, a selo in Nikolayevsky Selsoviet of Beloretsky District
Nikolayevka, Birsky District, Republic of Bashkortostan, a selo in Burnovsky Selsoviet of Birsky District
Nikolayevka, Blagoveshchensky District, Republic of Bashkortostan, a selo in Nikolayevsky Selsoviet of Blagoveshchensky District
Nikolayevka, Burayevsky District, Republic of Bashkortostan, a village in Teplyakovsky Selsoviet of Burayevsky District
Nikolayevka, Chekmagushevsky District, Republic of Bashkortostan, a village in Novobaltachevsky Selsoviet of Chekmagushevsky District
Nikolayevka, Fyodorovsky District, Republic of Bashkortostan, a village in Dedovsky Selsoviet of Fyodorovsky District
Nikolayevka, Karmaskalinsky District, Republic of Bashkortostan, a selo in Nikolayevsky Selsoviet of Karmaskalinsky District
Nikolayevka, Mishkinsky District, Republic of Bashkortostan, a village in Kameyevsky Selsoviet of Mishkinsky District
Nikolayevka, Miyakinsky District, Republic of Bashkortostan, a village in Miyakibashevsky Selsoviet of Miyakinsky District
Nikolayevka, Alataninsky Selsoviet, Sterlitamaksky District, Republic of Bashkortostan, a village in Alataninsky Selsoviet of Sterlitamaksky District
Nikolayevka, Nikolayevsky Selsoviet, Sterlitamaksky District, Republic of Bashkortostan, a selo in Nikolayevsky Selsoviet of Sterlitamaksky District
Nikolayevka, Tuymazinsky District, Republic of Bashkortostan, a selo in Nikolayevsky Selsoviet of Tuymazinsky District
Nikolayevka, Ufimsky District, Republic of Bashkortostan, a village in Nikolayevsky Selsoviet of Ufimsky District

Belgorod Oblast
As of 2010, seven rural localities in Belgorod Oblast bear this name:
Nikolayevka (selo), Alexeyevsky District, Belgorod Oblast, a selo in Alexeyevsky District
Nikolayevka (settlement), Alexeyevsky District, Belgorod Oblast, a settlement in Alexeyevsky District
Nikolayevka, Belgorodsky District, Belgorod Oblast, a selo in Belgorodsky District
Nikolayevka, Novooskolsky District, Belgorod Oblast, a selo in Novooskolsky District
Nikolayevka, Starooskolsky District, Belgorod Oblast, a selo in Starooskolsky District
Nikolayevka, Starooskolsky District, Belgorod Oblast, a selo in Starooskolsky District
Nikolayevka, Veydelevsky District, Belgorod Oblast, a selo in Veydelevsky District

Bryansk Oblast
As of 2010, seven rural localities in Bryansk Oblast bear this name:
Nikolayevka, Bryansky District, Bryansk Oblast, a village in Zhurinichsky Rural Administrative Okrug of Bryansky District
Nikolayevka, Kletnyansky District, Bryansk Oblast, a village in Muzhinovsky Rural Administrative Okrug of Kletnyansky District
Nikolayevka, Krasnogorsky District, Bryansk Oblast, a selo in Kolyudovsky Rural Administrative Okrug of Krasnogorsky District
Nikolayevka, Mglinsky District, Bryansk Oblast, a village in Molodkovsky Rural Administrative Okrug of Mglinsky District
Nikolayevka, Surazhsky District, Bryansk Oblast, a village in Degtyarevsky Rural Administrative Okrug of Surazhsky District
Nikolayevka, Vygonichsky District, Bryansk Oblast, a village under the administrative jurisdiction of Vygonichsky Settlement Administrative Okrug of Vygonichsky District
Nikolayevka, Zhukovsky District, Bryansk Oblast, a village in Khodilovichsky Rural Administrative Okrug of Zhukovsky District

Chelyabinsk Oblast
As of 2010, two rural localities in Chelyabinsk Oblast bear this name:
Nikolayevka, Varnensky District, Chelyabinsk Oblast, a selo in Nikolayevsky Selsoviet of Varnensky District
Nikolayevka, Yetkulsky District, Chelyabinsk Oblast, a village in Karatabansky Selsoviet of Yetkulsky District

Irkutsk Oblast
As of 2010, one rural locality in Irkutsk Oblast bears this name:
Nikolayevka, Irkutsk Oblast, a selo in Tayshetsky District

Ivanovo Oblast
As of 2010, one rural locality in Ivanovo Oblast bears this name:
Nikolayevka, Ivanovo Oblast, a village in Rodnikovsky District

Jewish Autonomous Oblast
As of 2010, one urban locality in the Jewish Autonomous Oblast bears this name:
Nikolayevka, Jewish Autonomous Oblast, a settlement in Smidovichsky District

Kaliningrad Oblast
As of 2010, one rural locality in Kaliningrad Oblast bears this name:
Nikolayevka, Kaliningrad Oblast, a settlement in Novostroyevsky Rural Okrug of Ozyorsky District

Kaluga Oblast
As of 2010, nine rural localities in Kaluga Oblast bear this name:
Nikolayevka, Borovsky District, Kaluga Oblast, a village in Borovsky District
Nikolayevka, Duminichsky District, Kaluga Oblast, a village in Duminichsky District
Nikolayevka, Dzerzhinsky District, Kaluga Oblast, a village in Dzerzhinsky District
Nikolayevka (Brontsy Rural Settlement), Ferzikovsky District, Kaluga Oblast, a village in Ferzikovsky District; municipally, a part of Brontsy Rural Settlement of that district
Nikolayevka (Dugna Urban Settlement), Ferzikovsky District, Kaluga Oblast, a village in Ferzikovsky District; municipally, a part of Dugna Urban Settlement of that district
Nikolayevka, Lyudinovsky District, Kaluga Oblast, a village in Lyudinovsky District
Nikolayevka, Maloyaroslavetsky District, Kaluga Oblast, a village in Maloyaroslavetsky District
Nikolayevka, Peremyshlsky District, Kaluga Oblast, a village in Peremyshlsky District
Nikolayevka, Ulyanovsky District, Kaluga Oblast, a village in Ulyanovsky District

Kamchatka Krai
As of 2010, one rural locality in Kamchatka Krai bears this name:
Nikolayevka, Kamchatka Krai, a selo in Yelizovsky District

Kemerovo Oblast
As of 2010, two rural localities in Kemerovo Oblast bear this name:
Nikolayevka, Chebulinsky District, Kemerovo Oblast, a selo in Usmanskaya Rural Territory of Chebulinsky District
Nikolayevka, Novokuznetsky District, Kemerovo Oblast, a settlement in Kurtukovskaya Rural Territory of Novokuznetsky District

Republic of Khakassia
As of 2010, one rural locality in the Republic of Khakassia bears this name:
Nikolayevka, Republic of Khakassia, a village in Balyksinsky Selsoviet of Askizsky District

Kirov Oblast
As of 2010, one rural locality in Kirov Oblast bears this name:
Nikolayevka, Kirov Oblast, a village under the administrative jurisdiction of the urban-type settlement of Nema in Nemsky District

Krasnodar Krai
As of 2010, one rural locality in Krasnodar Krai bears this name:
Nikolayevka, Krasnodar Krai, a selo in Nikolayevsky Rural Okrug of Shcherbinovsky District

Krasnoyarsk Krai
As of 2010, ten rural localities in Krasnoyarsk Krai bear this name:
Nikolayevka, Dzerzhinsky District, Krasnoyarsk Krai, a village in Alexandro-Yershinsky Selsoviet of Dzerzhinsky District
Nikolayevka, Idrinsky District, Krasnoyarsk Krai, a village in Romanovsky Selsoviet of Idrinsky District
Nikolayevka, Irbeysky District, Krasnoyarsk Krai, a village in Ivanovsky Selsoviet of Irbeysky District
Nikolayevka, Kansky District, Krasnoyarsk Krai, a village in Mokrushinsky Selsoviet of Kansky District
Nikolayevka, Krasnoturansky District, Krasnoyarsk Krai, a village in Sayansky Selsoviet of Krasnoturansky District
Nikolayevka, Kuraginsky District, Krasnoyarsk Krai, a village in Kursky Selsoviet of Kuraginsky District
Nikolayevka, Novosyolovsky District, Krasnoyarsk Krai, a village in Svetlolobovsky Selsoviet of Novosyolovsky District
Nikolayevka, Tyukhtetsky District, Krasnoyarsk Krai, a settlement in Leontyevsky Selsoviet of Tyukhtetsky District
Nikolayevka, Uyarsky District, Krasnoyarsk Krai, a village in Tolstikhinsky Selsoviet of Uyarsky District
Nikolayevka, Yermakovsky District, Krasnoyarsk Krai, a village in Yermakovsky Selsoviet of Yermakovsky District

Kurgan Oblast
As of 2010, two rural localities in Kurgan Oblast bear this name:
Nikolayevka, Shchuchansky District, Kurgan Oblast, a selo in Nikolayevsky Selsoviet of Shchuchansky District
Nikolayevka, Tselinny District, Kurgan Oblast, a village in Kislyansky Selsoviet of Tselinny District

Kursk Oblast
As of 2010, ten rural localities in Kursk Oblast bear this name:
Nikolayevka, Gorshechensky District, Kursk Oblast, a village in Bykovsky Selsoviet of Gorshechensky District
Nikolayevka, Kastorensky District, Kursk Oblast, a selo in Krasnoznamensky Selsoviet of Kastorensky District
Nikolayevka, Kurchatovsky District, Kursk Oblast, a village in Nikolayevsky Selsoviet of Kurchatovsky District
Nikolayevka, Brezhnevsky Selsoviet, Kursky District, Kursk Oblast, a village in Brezhnevsky Selsoviet of Kursky District
Nikolayevka, Verkhnekasinovsky Selsoviet, Kursky District, Kursk Oblast, a village in Verkhnekasinovsky Selsoviet of Kursky District
Nikolayevka, Borisovsky Selsoviet, Lgovsky District, Kursk Oblast, a village in Borisovsky Selsoviet of Lgovsky District
Nikolayevka, Maritsky Selsoviet, Lgovsky District, Kursk Oblast, a village in Maritsky Selsoviet of Lgovsky District
Nikolayevka, Medvensky District, Kursk Oblast, a village in Paninsky Selsoviet of Medvensky District
Nikolayevka, Sudzhansky District, Kursk Oblast, a village in Maloloknyansky Selsoviet of Sudzhansky District
Nikolayevka, Zolotukhinsky District, Kursk Oblast, a selo in Revolyutsionny Selsoviet of Zolotukhinsky District

Lipetsk Oblast
As of 2010, nine rural localities in Lipetsk Oblast bear this name:
Nikolayevka, Dankovsky District, Lipetsk Oblast, a village in Voskresensky Selsoviet of Dankovsky District
Nikolayevka, Dobrinsky District, Lipetsk Oblast, a village in Petrovsky Selsoviet of Dobrinsky District
Nikolayevka, Dobrovsky District, Lipetsk Oblast, a village in Korenevshchinsky Selsoviet of Dobrovsky District
Nikolayevka, Dolgorukovsky District, Lipetsk Oblast, a village in Veselovsky Selsoviet of Dolgorukovsky District
Nikolayevka, Petrovsky Selsoviet, Izmalkovsky District, Lipetsk Oblast, a village in Petrovsky Selsoviet of Izmalkovsky District
Nikolayevka, Preobrazhensky Selsoviet, Izmalkovsky District, Lipetsk Oblast, a village in Preobrazhensky Selsoviet of Izmalkovsky District
Nikolayevka, Krasninsky District, Lipetsk Oblast, a village in Alexandrovsky Selsoviet of Krasninsky District
Nikolayevka, Lev-Tolstovsky District, Lipetsk Oblast, a village in Novochemodanovsky Selsoviet of Lev-Tolstovsky District
Nikolayevka, Yeletsky District, Lipetsk Oblast, a village in Arkhangelsky Selsoviet of Yeletsky District

Mari El Republic
As of 2010, one rural locality in the Mari El Republic bears this name:
Nikolayevka, Mari El Republic, a village in Mikhaylovsky Rural Okrug of Sovetsky District

Republic of Mordovia
As of 2010, six inhabited localities in the Republic of Mordovia bear this name:
Nikolayevka, Saransk, Republic of Mordovia, a work settlement under the administrative jurisdiction of the city of republic significance of Saransk
Nikolayevka, Bolshebereznikovsky District, Republic of Mordovia, a selo in Bolshebereznikovsky Selsoviet of Bolshebereznikovsky District
Nikolayevka, Dubyonsky District, Republic of Mordovia, a selo in Nikolayevsky Selsoviet of Dubyonsky District
Nikolayevka, Lyambirsky District, Republic of Mordovia, a village in Dalny Selsoviet of Lyambirsky District
Nikolayevka, Staroshaygovsky District, Republic of Mordovia, a selo in Lemdyaysky Selsoviet of Staroshaygovsky District
Nikolayevka, Temnikovsky District, Republic of Mordovia, a village in Lavrentyevsky Selsoviet of Temnikovsky District

Moscow Oblast
As of 2010, three rural localities in Moscow Oblast bear this name:
Nikolayevka, Klinsky District, Moscow Oblast, a village in Nudolskoye Rural Settlement of Klinsky District
Nikolayevka, Mochilskoye Rural Settlement, Serebryano-Prudsky District, Moscow Oblast, a village in Mochilskoye Rural Settlement of Serebryano-Prudsky District
Nikolayevka, Uzunovskoye Rural Settlement, Serebryano-Prudsky District, Moscow Oblast, a village in Uzunovskoye Rural Settlement of Serebryano-Prudsky District

Nizhny Novgorod Oblast
As of 2010, nine rural localities in Nizhny Novgorod Oblast bear this name:
Nikolayevka, Semyonov, Nizhny Novgorod Oblast, a village in Bokovskoy Selsoviet of the city of oblast significance of Semyonov
Nikolayevka, Pervomaysk, Nizhny Novgorod Oblast, a selo under the administrative jurisdiction of the city of oblast significance of Pervomaysk
Nikolayevka, Bolshemurashkinsky District, Nizhny Novgorod Oblast, a village in Sovetsky Selsoviet of Bolshemurashkinsky District
Nikolayevka, Knyagininsky District, Nizhny Novgorod Oblast, a village in Vozrozhdensky Selsoviet of Knyagininsky District
Nikolayevka, Lukoyanovsky District, Nizhny Novgorod Oblast, a village in Shandrovsky Selsoviet of Lukoyanovsky District
Nikolayevka, Sechenovsky District, Nizhny Novgorod Oblast, a village in Kochetovsky Selsoviet of Sechenovsky District
Nikolayevka, Sergachsky District, Nizhny Novgorod Oblast, a village in Andreyevsky Selsoviet of Sergachsky District
Nikolayevka, Sosnovsky District, Nizhny Novgorod Oblast, a selo in Rozhkovsky Selsoviet of Sosnovsky District
Nikolayevka, Vorotynsky District, Nizhny Novgorod Oblast, a village in Krasnogorsky Selsoviet of Vorotynsky District

Novgorod Oblast
As of 2010, two rural localities in Novgorod Oblast bear this name:
Nikolayevka, Lyubytinsky District, Novgorod Oblast, a village under the administrative jurisdiction of Lyubytinskoye Settlement of Lyubytinsky District
Nikolayevka, Shimsky District, Novgorod Oblast, a village in Podgoshchskoye Settlement of Shimsky District

Novosibirsk Oblast
As of 2010, four rural localities in Novosibirsk Oblast bear this name:
Nikolayevka, Chanovsky District, Novosibirsk Oblast, a village in Chanovsky District
Nikolayevka, Kuybyshevsky District, Novosibirsk Oblast, a village in Kuybyshevsky District
Nikolayevka, Kyshtovsky District, Novosibirsk Oblast, a village in Kyshtovsky District
Nikolayevka, Tatarsky District, Novosibirsk Oblast, a selo in Tatarsky District

Omsk Oblast
As of 2010, seven rural localities in Omsk Oblast bear this name:
Nikolayevka, Cherlaksky District, Omsk Oblast, a selo in Nikolayevsky Rural Okrug of Cherlaksky District
Nikolayevka, Gorkovsky District, Omsk Oblast, a village in Sukhovskoy Rural Okrug of Gorkovsky District
Nikolayevka, Kolosovsky District, Omsk Oblast, a village in Kutyrlinsky Rural Okrug of Kolosovsky District
Nikolayevka, Moskalensky District, Omsk Oblast, a village in Zvezdinsky Rural Okrug of Moskalensky District
Nikolayevka, Nizhneomsky District, Omsk Oblast, a village in Staromalinovsky Rural Okrug of Nizhneomsky District
Nikolayevka, Okoneshnikovsky District, Omsk Oblast, a village in Zolotonivsky Rural Okrug of Okoneshnikovsky District
Nikolayevka, Sargatsky District, Omsk Oblast, a village in Bazhenovsky Rural Okrug of Sargatsky District

Orenburg Oblast
As of 2010, ten rural localities in Orenburg Oblast bear this name:
Nikolayevka, Alexandrovsky District, Orenburg Oblast, a selo in Zhdanovsky Selsoviet of Alexandrovsky District
Nikolayevka, Asekeyevsky District, Orenburg Oblast, a selo in Yakovlevsky Selsoviet of Asekeyevsky District
Nikolayevka, Polibinsky Selsoviet, Buguruslansky District, Orenburg Oblast, a selo in Polibinsky Selsoviet of Buguruslansky District
Nikolayevka, Sovetsky Selsoviet, Buguruslansky District, Orenburg Oblast, a settlement in Sovetsky Selsoviet of Buguruslansky District
Nikolayevka, Kairovsky Selsoviet, Saraktashsky District, Orenburg Oblast, a village in Kairovsky Selsoviet of Saraktashsky District
Nikolayevka, Nikolayevsky Selsoviet, Saraktashsky District, Orenburg Oblast, a selo in Nikolayevsky Selsoviet of Saraktashsky District
Nikolayevka, Sharlyksky District, Orenburg Oblast, a selo in Novomusinsky Selsoviet of Sharlyksky District
Nikolayevka, Sorochinsky District, Orenburg Oblast, a selo in Nikolayevsky Selsoviet of Sorochinsky District
Nikolayevka, Totsky District, Orenburg Oblast, a selo in Preobrazhensky Selsoviet of Totsky District
Nikolayevka, Tyulgansky District, Orenburg Oblast, a selo in Troitsky Selsoviet of Tyulgansky District

Oryol Oblast
As of 2010, two rural localities in Oryol Oblast bear this name:
Nikolayevka, Pokrovsky District, Oryol Oblast, a village in Zhuravetsky Selsoviet of Pokrovsky District
Nikolayevka, Zalegoshchensky District, Oryol Oblast, a village in Verkhneskvorchensky Selsoviet of Zalegoshchensky District

Penza Oblast
As of 2010, eleven rural localities in Penza Oblast bear this name:
Nikolayevka, Bashmakovsky District, Penza Oblast, a selo in Kandiyevsky Selsoviet of Bashmakovsky District
Nikolayevka, Bekovsky District, Penza Oblast, a village in Yakovlevsky Selsoviet of Bekovsky District
Nikolayevka, Bessonovsky District, Penza Oblast, a settlement in Bessonovsky Selsoviet of Bessonovsky District
Nikolayevka, Issinsky District, Penza Oblast, a selo in Uvarovsky Selsoviet of Issinsky District
Nikolayevka, Kamensky District, Penza Oblast, a village in Vladykinsky Selsoviet of Kamensky District
Nikolayevka, Lopatinsky District, Penza Oblast, a selo in Lopatinsky Selsoviet of Lopatinsky District
Nikolayevka, Luninsky District, Penza Oblast, a village in Bolotnikovsky Selsoviet of Luninsky District
Nikolayevka, Maloserdobinsky District, Penza Oblast, a selo in Lipovsky Selsoviet of Maloserdobinsky District
Nikolayevka, Mokshansky District, Penza Oblast, a village in Plessky Selsoviet of Mokshansky District
Nikolayevka, Olenevsky Selsoviet, Penzensky District, Penza Oblast, a village in Olenevsky Selsoviet of Penzensky District
Nikolayevka, Salovsky Selsoviet, Penzensky District, Penza Oblast, a selo in Salovsky Selsoviet of Penzensky District

Primorsky Krai
As of 2010, two rural localities in Primorsky Krai bear this name:
Nikolayevka, Mikhaylovsky District, Primorsky Krai, a selo in Mikhaylovsky District
Nikolayevka, Partizansky District, Primorsky Krai, a settlement in Partizansky District

Rostov Oblast
As of 2010, four rural localities in Rostov Oblast bear this name:
Nikolayevka, Millerovsky District, Rostov Oblast, a khutor in Turilovskoye Rural Settlement of Millerovsky District
Nikolayevka, Neklinovsky District, Rostov Oblast, a selo in Nikolayevskoye Rural Settlement of Neklinovsky District
Nikolayevka, Oktyabrsky District, Rostov Oblast, a khutor in Mokrologskoye Rural Settlement of Oktyabrsky District
Nikolayevka, Peschanokopsky District, Rostov Oblast, a selo in Polivyanskoye Rural Settlement of Peschanokopsky District

Ryazan Oblast
As of 2010, twelve rural localities in Ryazan Oblast bear this name:
Nikolayevka, Kadomsky District, Ryazan Oblast, a village in Sumersky Rural Okrug of Kadomsky District
Nikolayevka, Kasimovsky District, Ryazan Oblast, a village in Ardabyevsky Rural Okrug of Kasimovsky District
Nikolayevka, Korablinsky District, Ryazan Oblast, a village in Nikolayevsky Rural Okrug of Korablinsky District
Nikolayevka, Ilyichevsky Rural Okrug, Mikhaylovsky District, Ryazan Oblast, a village in Ilyichevsky Rural Okrug of Mikhaylovsky District
Nikolayevka, Rachatnikovsky Rural Okrug, Mikhaylovsky District, Ryazan Oblast, a selo in Rachatnikovsky Rural Okrug of Mikhaylovsky District
Nikolayevka, Chernavsky Rural Okrug, Miloslavsky District, Ryazan Oblast, a village in Chernavsky Rural Okrug of Miloslavsky District
Nikolayevka, Danilovsky Rural Okrug, Miloslavsky District, Ryazan Oblast, a village in Danilovsky Rural Okrug of Miloslavsky District
Nikolayevka, Alexandro-Nevsky District, Ryazan Oblast, a village in Pavlovsky Rural Okrug of Alexandro-Nevsky District
Nikolayevka, Sarayevsky District, Ryazan Oblast, a village in Boretsky Rural Okrug of Sarayevsky District
Nikolayevka, Sasovsky District, Ryazan Oblast, a village in Verkhne-Nikolsky Rural Okrug of Sasovsky District
Nikolayevka, Shilovsky District, Ryazan Oblast, a village in Mosolovsky Rural Okrug of Shilovsky District
Nikolayevka, Yermishinsky District, Ryazan Oblast, a village in Nadezhkinsky Rural Okrug of Yermishinsky District

Samara Oblast
As of 2010, three rural localities in Samara Oblast bear this name:
Nikolayevka, Koshkinsky District, Samara Oblast, a village in Koshkinsky District
Nikolayevka, Krasnoyarsky District, Samara Oblast, a village in Krasnoyarsky District
Nikolayevka, Volzhsky District, Samara Oblast, a selo in Volzhsky District

Saratov Oblast
As of 2010, twelve rural localities in Saratov Oblast bear this name:
Nikolayevka, Atkarsky District, Saratov Oblast, a village in Atkarsky District
Nikolayevka, Fyodorovsky District, Saratov Oblast, a selo in Fyodorovsky District
Nikolayevka, Ivanteyevsky District, Saratov Oblast, a selo in Ivanteyevsky District
Nikolayevka, Kalininsky District, Saratov Oblast, a village in Kalininsky District
Nikolayevka, Kalininsky District, Saratov Oblast, a village in Kalininsky District
Nikolayevka, Lysogorsky District, Saratov Oblast, a village in Lysogorsky District
Nikolayevka, Perelyubsky District, Saratov Oblast, a village in Perelyubsky District
Nikolayevka, Petrovsky District, Saratov Oblast, a selo in Petrovsky District
Nikolayevka, Samoylovsky District, Saratov Oblast, a selo in Samoylovsky District
Nikolayevka, Turkovsky District, Saratov Oblast, a village in Turkovsky District
Nikolayevka, Volsky District, Saratov Oblast, a selo in Volsky District
Nikolayevka, Yekaterinovsky District, Saratov Oblast, a village in Yekaterinovsky District

Smolensk Oblast
As of 2010, four rural localities in Smolensk Oblast bear this name:
Nikolayevka, Khislavichsky District, Smolensk Oblast, a village in Vladimirovskoye Rural Settlement of Khislavichsky District
Nikolayevka, Krasninsky District, Smolensk Oblast, a village in Oktyabrskoye Rural Settlement of Krasninsky District
Nikolayevka, Tyomkinsky District, Smolensk Oblast, a village in Kikinskoye Rural Settlement of Tyomkinsky District
Nikolayevka, Yershichsky District, Smolensk Oblast, a village in Besedkovskoye Rural Settlement of Yershichsky District

Tambov Oblast
As of 2010, eleven rural localities in Tambov Oblast bear this name:
Nikolayevka, Kirsanovsky District, Tambov Oblast, a village in Sokolovsky Selsoviet of Kirsanovsky District
Nikolayevka, Mordovsky District, Tambov Oblast, a village in Shulginsky Selsoviet of Mordovsky District
Nikolayevka, Morshansky District, Tambov Oblast, a selo in Starotomnikovsky Selsoviet of Morshansky District
Nikolayevka, Petrovsky District, Tambov Oblast, a village in Petrovsky Selsoviet of Petrovsky District
Nikolayevka, Pichayevsky District, Tambov Oblast, a village in Pokrovo-Vasilyevsky Selsoviet of Pichayevsky District
Nikolayevka, Rzhaksinsky District, Tambov Oblast, a village in Gavrilovsky Selsoviet of Rzhaksinsky District
Nikolayevka, Avdeyevsky Selsoviet, Tambovsky District, Tambov Oblast, a village in Avdeyevsky Selsoviet of Tambovsky District
Nikolayevka, Krasnosvobodnensky Selsoviet, Tambovsky District, Tambov Oblast, a village in Krasnosvobodnensky Selsoviet of Tambovsky District
Nikolayevka, Alexandrovsky Selsoviet, Tokaryovsky District, Tambov Oblast, a village in Alexandrovsky Selsoviet of Tokaryovsky District
Nikolayevka, Poletayevsky Selsoviet, Tokaryovsky District, Tambov Oblast, a village in Poletayevsky Selsoviet of Tokaryovsky District
Nikolayevka, Znamensky District, Tambov Oblast, a village in Pokrovo-Marfinsky Selsoviet of Znamensky District

Republic of Tatarstan
As of 2010, four rural localities in the Republic of Tatarstan bear this name:
Nikolayevka, Chistopolsky District, Republic of Tatarstan, a settlement in Chistopolsky District
Nikolayevka, Menzelinsky District, Republic of Tatarstan, a selo in Menzelinsky District
Nikolayevka, Nizhnekamsky District, Republic of Tatarstan, a village in Nizhnekamsky District
Nikolayevka, Rybno-Slobodsky District, Republic of Tatarstan, a village in Rybno-Slobodsky District

Tomsk Oblast
As of 2010, two rural localities in Tomsk Oblast bear this name:
Nikolayevka, Shegarsky District, Tomsk Oblast, a village in Shegarsky District
Nikolayevka, Tomsky District, Tomsk Oblast, a village in Tomsky District

Tula Oblast
As of 2010, six rural localities in Tula Oblast bear this name:
Nikolayevka, Belyovsky District, Tula Oblast, a village in Bobrikovsky Rural Okrug of Belyovsky District
Nikolayevka, Kimovsky District, Tula Oblast, a village in Korablinsky Rural Okrug of Kimovsky District
Nikolayevka, Karamyshevskaya Rural Administration, Shchyokinsky District, Tula Oblast, a village in Karamyshevskaya Rural Administration of Shchyokinsky District
Nikolayevka, Selivanovskaya Rural Administration, Shchyokinsky District, Tula Oblast, a village in Selivanovskaya Rural Administration of Shchyokinsky District
Nikolayevka, Medvedsky Rural Okrug, Yefremovsky District, Tula Oblast, a village in Medvedsky Rural Okrug of Yefremovsky District
Nikolayevka, Yaroslavsky Rural Okrug, Yefremovsky District, Tula Oblast, a village in Yaroslavsky Rural Okrug of Yefremovsky District

Tver Oblast
As of 2010, two rural localities in Tver Oblast bear this name:
Nikolayevka, Kalyazinsky District, Tver Oblast, a village in Starobislovskoye Rural Settlement of Kalyazinsky District
Nikolayevka, Torzhoksky District, Tver Oblast, a village in Vysokovskoye Rural Settlement of Torzhoksky District

Tyumen Oblast
As of 2010, three rural localities in Tyumen Oblast bear this name:
Nikolayevka, Aromashevsky District, Tyumen Oblast, a village in Slobodchikovsky Rural Okrug of Aromashevsky District
Nikolayevka, Ishimsky District, Tyumen Oblast, a village in Shablykinsky Rural Okrug of Ishimsky District
Nikolayevka, Uporovsky District, Tyumen Oblast, a selo in Chernakovsky Rural Okrug of Uporovsky District

Udmurt Republic
As of 2010, one rural locality in the Udmurt Republic bears this name:
Nikolayevka, Udmurt Republic, a village in Sepsky Selsoviet of Igrinsky District

Ulyanovsk Oblast
As of 2010, two inhabited localities in Ulyanovsk Oblast bear this name:
Nikolayevka, Nikolayevsky District, Ulyanovsk Oblast, a work settlement in Nikolayevsky Settlement Okrug of Nikolayevsky District
Nikolayevka, Bazarnosyzgansky District, Ulyanovsk Oblast, a village in Dolzhnikovsky Rural Okrug of Bazarnosyzgansky District

Vladimir Oblast
As of 2010, three rural localities in Vladimir Oblast bear this name:
Nikolayevka (Krasnoplamenskoye Rural Settlement), Alexandrovsky District, Vladimir Oblast, a village in Alexandrovsky District; municipally, a part of Krasnoplamenskoye Rural Settlement of that district
Nikolayevka (Andreyevskoye Rural Settlement), Alexandrovsky District, Vladimir Oblast, a village in Alexandrovsky District; municipally, a part of Andreyevskoye Rural Settlement of that district
Nikolayevka, Kolchuginsky District, Vladimir Oblast, a village in Kolchuginsky District

Volgograd Oblast
As of 2010, one rural locality in Volgograd Oblast bears this name:
Nikolayevka, Volgograd Oblast, a khutor in Bolshevistsky Selsoviet of Yelansky District

Voronezh Oblast
As of 2010, six rural localities in Voronezh Oblast bear this name:
Nikolayevka, Nikolayevskoye Rural Settlement, Anninsky District, Voronezh Oblast, a selo in Nikolayevskoye Rural Settlement of Anninsky District
Nikolayevka, Novozhiznenskoye Rural Settlement, Anninsky District, Voronezh Oblast, a settlement in Novozhiznenskoye Rural Settlement of Anninsky District
Nikolayevka, Liskinsky District, Voronezh Oblast, a selo in Petropavlovskoye Rural Settlement of Liskinsky District
Nikolayevka, Pavlovsky District, Voronezh Oblast, a selo in Kazinskoye Rural Settlement of Pavlovsky District
Nikolayevka, Ternovsky District, Voronezh Oblast, a selo in Nikolayevskoye Rural Settlement of Ternovsky District
Nikolayevka, Verkhnekhavsky District, Voronezh Oblast, a settlement in Verkhnemazovskoye Rural Settlement of Verkhnekhavsky District

Zabaykalsky Krai
As of 2010, one rural locality in Zabaykalsky Krai bears this name:
Nikolayevka, Zabaykalsky Krai, a selo in Alexandrovo-Zavodsky District